The Board of Governors of the BBC was the governing body of the British Broadcasting Corporation. It consisted of twelve people who together regulated the BBC and represented the interests of the public. It existed from 1927 until it was replaced by the BBC Trust on 1 January 2007.

The governors were independent of the Director-General and the rest of the BBC's executive team. They had no direct say in programme-making, but were nevertheless accountable to Parliament and to licence fee payers for the BBC's actions. Although a 'state broadcaster', the BBC is theoretically protected from government interference due to the statutory independence of its governing body.

The Governors' role was to appoint the Director-General (and in earlier years, other key BBC staff). They approved strategy and policy, set objectives, oversaw complaints, and produced Annual Reports that documented the BBC's performance and compliance each year.

The role of chairman of the Board of Governors, though a non-executive, was one of the most important positions in British media.

Appointments

Governors were usually appointed from senior positions in various walks of British society. Appointments were part-time positions and lasted for four (formerly five) years. Four governors were given specific responsibilities: for Scotland, Wales, Northern Ireland and the English regions.

Governors were nominally appointed by the monarch on the advice of ministers. In practice, governors were chosen by the government of the day. This has led to claims of political interference, in particular during the years of Margaret Thatcher's premiership.

Controversy

The Thatcher government appointed a succession of governors with the apparent intent of bringing the BBC "into line" with government policy. Marmaduke Hussey was appointed chairman of the Board of Governors apparently with the specific agenda of bringing down the then-Director-General Alasdair Milne; this government also broke the tradition of always having a trade union leader on the Board of Governors.

BBC director general Mark Thompson said "staff were "quite mystified" by the rise of Margaret Thatcher but that there was "less overt tribalism" among its journalists.

It has also been suggested that Harold Wilson's appointment of the former Tory minister Lord Hill as chairman of the Board of Governors in 1967 was motivated by a desire to undermine the radical, questioning agenda of Director-General Sir Hugh Greene – ironically Wilson had attacked the appointment of Hill as Chairman of the Independent Television Authority by a Conservative government in 1963.

In January 2004 Gavyn Davies, who had been appointed chairman of the Board of Governors by the Labour government in 2001, resigned in the wake of the Hutton Inquiry.  Lord Ryder of Wensum, previously a Conservative Member of Parliament and a member of Margaret Thatcher's personal staff, replaced him as Acting Chairman.  It has been claimed that Ryder and other Conservatives on the Board of Governors were effectively responsible for "forcing out" Director-General Greg Dyke, who had not initially believed that his offer of resignation would be accepted by the Governors.

In May 2004, Michael Grade took over as permanent chairman. He was to be the last permanent chairman of the Board of Governors.

Chairmen of the Board of Governors

Lord Gainford (chairman of the British Broadcasting Company, before incorporation) (1922)
Earl of Clarendon (first chairman of the British Broadcasting Corporation) (1927)
John Henry Whitley (1930)
Viscount Bridgeman (1935)
Ronald Collet Norman (1935)
Allan Powell (1940)
Lord Inman (1947)
Lord Simon of Wythenshawe (1947)
Sir Alexander Cadogan (1952)
Sir Arthur fforde (1957)
Sir James Fitzjames Duff (1964)
Lord Normanbrook (1964)
Lord Hill of Luton (1967)
Sir Michael Swann (1973)
Sir George Howard, latterly Lord Howard of Henderskelfe (1980)
Stuart Young (1983)
Sir Marmaduke Hussey, latterly Lord Hussey of North Bradley (1986)
Sir Christopher Bland (1996)
Gavyn Davies (October 2001 – 28 January 2004)
Lord Ryder of Wensum (acting chairman) (28 January 2004 – 17 May 2004)
Michael Grade (17 May 2004 – 28 November 2006)

The last Board of Governors

The governors as of the board's dissolution on 31 December 2006 were:

Anthony Salz (Acting Chairman)
Ranjit Sondhi (Governor for the English regions)
Fabian Monds (National Governor for Northern Ireland)
Merfyn Jones (National Governor for Wales)
Jeremy Peat (National Governor for Scotland)
Deborah Bull
 Andrew Burns
Dermot Gleeson
Angela Sarkis
Richard Tait
 Note: Michael Grade had left the BBC before the dissolution of the board to take up the position of Executive Chairman at rival broadcaster ITV plc.

References

External links

BBC Annual Reports

1927 establishments in the United Kingdom
2007 disestablishments in the United Kingdom
Organizations established in 1927
Organizations disestablished in 2007